Manlio Bacigalupo (5 September 1908 – 1 December 1977) was an Italian association football goalkeeper and manager from Vado Ligure, Savona.

Playing career
Over the course of his career, Bacigalupo played for five Italian sides, spending the most of his time with Genoa and Venezia, also playing for Torino.

Personal life
Manilo's brother, Valerio Bacigalupo, was also a footballer, and the goalkeeper of the Grande Torino side that died in the Superga air disaster.

Honours
Torino
Italian Football Championship: 1927–28

Genoa
Serie B: 1934–35
Coppa Italia: 1936–37

Venezia
Coppa Italia: 1940–41

References

1908 births
1977 deaths
Italian footballers
Association football goalkeepers
Serie A players
Serie B players
Torino F.C. players
Genoa C.F.C. players
Venezia F.C. players
Virtus Entella players
Sportspeople from the Province of Savona
Footballers from Liguria